Tsukudajima (佃島, "Tsukuda Island") is a small island in Tokyo Bay, facing Tsukiji to its west. Originally, Tsukudajima was a tiny island at the mouth of the Edogawa river in Tokyo Bay. It was inhabited by a fishing community who migrated from Osaka in early 1600s. It is home to the famous dish Tsukudani (佃煮). Next to it was built on reclaimed land the high-rise district of Tsukishima.

Education

Public elementary and junior high schools are operated by Chuo City Board of Education.

Zoned elementary schools for Tsukuda include:
Tsukudajima Elementary School (佃島小学校)'s boundary includes all of 1-chome and 2-chome
Tsukishima Daiichi (Tsukishima No. 1) Elementary School (月島第一小学校)'s boundary includes all of 3-chome

All of Tsukuda is zoned to Tsukuda Junior High School (佃中学校).

References

Districts of Chūō, Tokyo
Islands of Tokyo